Ross Partridge (born February 26, 1968) is an American  actor, director, screenwriter and producer.

His most notable work as a director is the 2015 adaptation of the book Lamb, which Partridge wrote, starred in and directed. As an actor, he has had recurring roles in the critically acclaimed Netflix series Stranger Things, the Showtime series Billions, and the HBO series Insecure. He is the co-executive producer of Room 104 and has also directed three episodes ("Phoenix", "FOMO", and "Mr. Mulvahill"), written two episodes, and starred in one episode of the series.

Personal life
Partridge is a native of Kingston, New York and attended the University of California, Santa Cruz after high school.
In May 2016, Partridge married actress Jennifer Lafleur after 10 years of dating.

Filmography

References

External links

 

1968 births
American male film actors
American male television actors
American male screenwriters
American television directors
Film producers from New York (state)
Living people
People from Kingston, New York
Film directors from New York (state)
Screenwriters from New York (state)